Sam Branch is a stream in Iron County in the U.S. state of Missouri.

Sam Branch has the name of Sam Williamson, an early settler.

See also
List of rivers of Missouri

References

Rivers of Iron County, Missouri
Rivers of Missouri